Sesamum radiatum is a species of flowering plant in the Pedaliaceae. It is in the same genus as sesame, and is known by the English common names benniseed, black benniseed, black sesame, and vegetable sesame. It is native to west and central Africa, has been cultivated since ancient times in Africa, and is sometimes also used in tropical Asia where it has become naturalized to a small extent.

Etymology
Benniseed is a portmanteau of both the word benne and seed. Benne, meaning sesame derives from Gullah benne which is akin to Malinke bĕne.

Use

Culinary
The seeds are eaten whole, made into a paste, ground into a powder, or pressed for a high-quality oil. The leaves can be eaten fresh or cooked and are used in Sub-Saharan Africa as a leaf vegetable.  The leaves are mucilaginous in texture when cooked. The shoots can also be eaten and are used in soups and porridge.

Medicinally
The leaves are also used medicinally as a laxative, an antidote to scorpion venom and to treat sprains and ease childbirth. The stem and bark have also been noted for their anti-bacterial properties.

Cultivation

The leaves are opposite, or toward the top of the plant, alternately arranged. They may be smooth-edged or serrated. Flowers occur singly in the leaf axils. They are pink to purple in color, sometimes white, and somewhat bell-shaped.

This plant grows wild in savanna and other habitat types. It is also a weed of fields and homesteads. It can grow on poor, rocky soils and it flowers even through drought conditions. When cultivated the plant yields  of leaves per hectare.

This plant is vulnerable to the leaf spot disease Cercospora sesami. It is also attacked by hawk moths (Sphingidae), the moth Antigastra catalaunalis, and the vegetable bug Nezara viridula.

References

External links

Pedaliaceae
Leaf vegetables
Taxa named by Heinrich Christian Friedrich Schumacher